The Beautiful Virgin Mary from Krużlowa is a Gothic sculpture made from linden-tree timber, found 1889 in the Catholic parish church in the Krużlowa Wyżna village (Lesser Poland Voivodeship, Nowy Sącz County, Grybów commune) by Władysław Łuszczkiewicz and Stanisław Wyspiański. Since 1899 the sculpture is part of the National Museum, Kraków collections.

The sculpture belongs to the so-called soft style of International Gothic art, and is an example of the "Beautiful Madonnas". 

It was made on the beginning of the fifteenth century by an unknown artist.

It shows Virgin Mary with naked Baby Jesus holding an apple. The Virgin stands in counterpose, her clothes are rich pleated.

Probably was this sculpture assigned for one of Cracow churches, but in the seventeenth century it was replaced by newer baroque sculptures and carried to the village church of Krużlowa. The first written message was dated 1607, the next from 1766. The sculpture was first placed on the High Altar of the church, but later was moved to the entrance hall, and finally, because of threat of bark beetles was removed to the church attic and forgotten.

The sculpture was found by the two artists in a very bad condition, coated with a three layers of oil paint, partially erased to the wooden ground. The sculpture was bought by the National Museum, Kraków and exhibited in the Sukiennice Museum at Kraków Cloth Hall starting in 1924 in the City Hall tower. In 1940 the sculpture was requisitioned by the German occupation forces and was posed in the office of the Nazi governor Hans Frank at Wawel castle. Since October 2007, the sculpture has been part of the art collections of the Erasmus Ciołek Bishop's Palace, a part of the Kraków National Museum.

Gallery

References 
 Tadeusz Chrzanowski, Marian Kornecki, Sztuka Ziemi Krakowskiej, Kraków 1970. (The Art of Cracow Land)
 Madonna of Krużlowa (English)
Erazm Ciołek Palace (English)

Polish sculpture
Wooden sculptures in Poland
Sculptures of saints
Statues of the Madonna and Child
15th-century sculptures